The Morwell River is a perennial river of the West Gippsland catchment, located in the West Gippsland and South Gippsland regions of the Australian state of Victoria.

Location and features
Formed by the confluence of the West Branch and East Branch of the river, the Morwell River rises in the Strzelecki Ranges, below  South. The river descends  over its  course. The lower reaches of the river has been diverted around open-cut coal mines by channels and pipelines until it enters the Latrobe River.

On 6 June 2012, a levee bank failure resulted in the flooding of the Yallourn coal mine causing damage to its infrastructure and cutting fuel supply to the adjacent power station.

See also

 Rivers of Victoria

References

External links
 
 

West Gippsland catchment
Rivers of Gippsland (region)
Morwell, Victoria